Lavos is a seaside parish in Figueira da Foz Municipality, Portugal. The population in 2011 was 3,999, in an area of 42.02 km².

References

Freguesias of Figueira da Foz